Jay McCarroll (born October 11, 1974) is a fashion designer who gained fame after winning the debut season of the competitive reality show Project Runway in 2005.

Career
McCarroll lists Alexander McQueen as his favorite designer.  He originally hailed from the Back Mountain, Pennsylvania, area before moving to London to study at the London College of Fashion. He lived in London selling clothes in Camden Market after he graduated,  and he sold clothing in Amsterdam before moving back to the U.S.

Like the show's other participants, McCarroll was struggling to get recognition as a fashion designer before the show began airing on December 1, 2004, on the Bravo cable television network. When McCarroll won the show's first season, becoming the only winner so far to never win a challenge, he was awarded $100,000, a mentorship from Banana Republic, and a spot in the prestigious 2005 New York Fashion Week event. However, Jay turned down the money and the mentorship, citing a contractual clause stipulating that the Project Runway production company would own a 10% stake of all his professional ventures in perpetuity. The company has since dropped this clause.

In April 2008 McCarroll launched his blog and designer fashion boutique, The Colony by Jay McCarroll.

After leaving New York, McCarroll now teaches at Philadelphia University and has a fashion line on QVC.

McCarroll is a designer for Field of View winter guard in West Chester, Pennsylvania.

McCarroll has appeared numerous times on the PBS TV show Quilting Arts.

In an episode aired on 5 April 2010, McCarroll won the seventh season of Celebrity Fit Club on VH1, having lost 40 pounds over the course of his time on the program.

In February 2020 McCarroll was employed in the wardrobe department of the television series Mare of Easttown, coordinating clothing for background extras.

In the media
Since winning Project Runway, McCarroll has been interviewed by various media outlets, such as The Village Voice. He spends part of his time living in New York, working on his new projects and trying to strengthen his position as a designer. He helped pick contestants for the second season of Project Runway, and filmed a one-hour documentary, Project Jay, which focused on his attempts to establish himself after his win. The special first aired February 22, 2006, on Bravo.

McCarroll returned to Fashion Week on September 15, 2006, debuting his new collection, Transport, with a show under the prestigious tents. He explained, "My new collection will take the fashion consumer to a higher plane of consciousness and encourage people to see fashion from a different perspective."

His collection was sponsored by the Humane Society of the United States, reflecting his anti-fur stance. He also mentioned that this was his first showing since the first-season finale of Project Runway. He changed the theme of his collection, which was initially inspired by the Pet Shop Boys' 1986 hit "West End Girls." The collection featured more of a futuristic theme and had both men's and women's looks.

The entire process of his designing, building, showing and attempts at selling his Transport line was documented in a feature film called Eleven Minutes, which debuted at the Philadelphia Film Festival on April 5, 2008.

It was reported on August 6, 2007, by The Daily 10 on E! that McCarroll was homeless and relying on the kindness of friends who are allowing him to stay at their apartments. The reports turned out to be in error.

References

External links

Olympus Fashion Week  Jay McCarroll's Spring 2007 Collection
Fashion Wire Daily  Jay McCarroll's Spring 2007 Collection Reviewed
Jay McCarroll shares his favorite NY places at ontheinside.info
Eleven Minutes—official website of feature documentary on the making of his Spring 2007 Collection
Elle Tell All: Project Runway featuring Jay McCarroll's blog

1974 births
American fashion designers
LGBT fashion designers
Living people
Project Runway (American series) participants
People from the Scranton–Wilkes-Barre metropolitan area
Reality show winners
Artists from Philadelphia